The Fatal Eggs is a novella by Mikhail Bulgakov, a Soviet novelist and playwright whose most famous work is The Master and Margarita. It was written in 1924 and first published in 1925. The novel became quite popular, but was much criticised by most Soviet critics as a mockery of the Russian Revolution of 1917 and the leadership of Soviet Russia.

Background
By 1924, Bulgakov was relatively well known as a writer. He had published several short stories, including Dyavoliada, in some ways a precursor to Master and Margarita, and started publishing his first novel, The White Guard. The Fatal Eggs was finished in early October 1924 and published in the Nedra journal in February 1925, then included in the short-story collection Diaboliad later that year. A shortened edition was also published in May–June 1925 in the Krasnaya Panorama journal, under the title The Ray of Life (Russian: Луч жизни). Bulgakov also read the novel on several occasions to various social gatherings, where it met with favorable reception.

Plot summary

The Fatal Eggs can be described as a satirical science fiction novel. Its main protagonist is an aging zoologist, Vladimir Ipatyevich Persikov, a specialist in amphibians. The narration begins in Moscow of 1928, which seems to have overcome the destructive effects of the Russian Civil War and is quite prosperous. After a long period of degradation, research at the Zoological Institute has revived. After leaving his microscope for several hours, Persikov suddenly noticed that the  out-of-focus microscope produced a ray of red light; amoeba left under that light showed an impossibly increased rate of binary fission, reproducing at enormous speeds and demonstrating unusual aggression. Later experiments with large cameras — to produce a larger ray — confirmed that the same increased speed of reproduction applied to other organisms, such as frogs, which evolved and produced a next generation within two days. Persikov's invention quickly becomes known to journalists, and eventually to foreign spies and to the GPU, the Soviet secret service. At the same time, the country is affected by an unknown disease in domesticated poultry, which results in a complete extinction of all chickens in the Soviet Russia, with the plague stopping at the nation's borders. A sovkhoz manager Aleksandr Semenovich Rokk (whose name is also a pun on the novel's title, Rok meaning fate) receives an official permission to confiscate Persikov's equipment, and use the invention to attempt to restore the chicken populace to the pre-plague level. However, the chicken eggs which are imported from outside the country are, by a mistake, sent to Persikov's laboratory while the reptile eggs destined for the professor end up in the hands of the farmers. As a result, Rokk breeds an enormous quantity of large and overly aggressive snakes, ostriches, and crocodiles which start attacking people. In the panic that follows, Persikov is killed by a mob — which blames him for the appearance of the snakes — and his cameras are smashed. The Red Army attempts to hold the snakes back, but only the coming of sub-zero weather in August—described as a deus ex machina—puts a stop to the snake invasion. In an earlier draft the novel ends with the scene of Moscow's complete destruction by the snakes.

Analysis and critical reception

A number of influences on the novel can be detected. One of the sources behind The Fatal Eggs was H. G. Wells's 1904 novel The Food of the Gods and How It Came to Earth, where two scientists discover a way to accelerate growth — which at first results in a plague of gigantic chickens, and eventually in an all-out war between people affected by growth and those who are not. The novel is in fact referenced in the  text of the novel in a conversation between Persikov and his assistant.  It has also been noted that the death of the snakes from cold weather though they successfully resisted the military force is reminiscent of the death of aliens from a pathogen bacteria in The War of the Worlds. Other influences may include rumours of "a giant reptile [in the Crimea], to capture which a regiment of Red Guards was deployed".

The events of The Fatal Eggs were usually seen as a critique of Soviet Russia. Indeed, there was a case to be made for Professor Persikov's identification with Vladimir Ilyich Lenin (note the similarity in names), as both of them can be said to have unleashed destruction on Russia, and there seem to be similarities between them both in appearance and character. Chicken plague and the sanitary cordons that foreign countries established against it were seen as a parody of the ideas of internationalism and the policy of the Entente against it. Although Bulgakov was not repressed, from 1925 he was questioned by the GPU several times and was never allowed to leave the Soviet Union, possibly as a result of his negative image which was at least partly due to the publication of The Fatal Eggs. Although there were positive responses, upon the whole the novel was viewed as dangerous and anti-Soviet.

Bulgakov was aware that the story might be displeasing to the authorities – after presenting the story at a literary evening in late 1924, he wrote in his diary: 'Is it a satire? Or a provocative gesture? ... I'm afraid that I might be hauled off ... for all these heroic feats.'

English translations
There are a number of English translations of The Fatal Eggs, including:
Mirra Ginsburg, Grove Press, 1968,  
Carl Proffer, in Diaboliad, Indiana University Press, 1972, ISBN 978-0-25311605-5
Hugh Aplin, Hesperus Press, 2003,  
Michael Karpelson, Translit Publishing, 2010,

Film, TV or theatrical adaptations

A film adaptation directed by Sergei Lomkin was released in 1996. The cast included Oleg Yankovsky.

On April 17, 1981 the CBC Radio program Nightfall broadcast an adaptation.

A two-part Italian TV adaptation was broadcast by RAI in 1977.

Footnotes

See also 
 1925 in science fiction

References
  The Fateful Eggs, translated by Kathleen Gook-Horujy at Lib.ru.
  The original text at Lib.ru.
  The Fatal Eggs article in Bulgakov Encyclopedia at www.bulgakov.ru
 1996 film profile at IMDb.

1925 science fiction novels
Soviet science fiction novels
Russian novellas
Novels by Mikhail Bulgakov
Russian novels adapted into films
1925 Russian novels